Playgreen Lake or Play Green Lake, is a lake in the province of Manitoba in Canada. The lake is the ninth largest lake in the province. It was first mapped by noted British surveyor, map-maker, chief fur trader and the explorer Peter Fidler in 1809.

Hydrography 

The Nelson River flows into Playgreen Lake from Lake Winnipeg then flows from two channels into Cross Lake.

The east channel and the Jack River flow from the southeast portion of the lake into Little Playgreen Lake then the Nelson east channel continues in a northerly direction passing through Pipestone Lake on its way to Cross Lake. The Echimamish River in this section leads to the Hayes River and York Factory on the Hudson Bay part of early Canadian canoe routes important during the North American fur trade.

The west channel flows out of the north ends of Playgreen Lake, Kiskittogisu Lake and Kiskitto Lake into Cross Lake at the Manitoba Hydro's Jenpeg Generating Station and Dam.

See also
List of lakes of Manitoba

References

Lakes of Manitoba